Mycoplasma agassizii  is a species of bacteria in the genus Mycoplasma. This genus of bacteria lacks a cell wall around their cell membrane. Without a cell wall, they are unaffected by many common antibiotics such as penicillin or other beta-lactam antibiotics that target cell wall synthesis. Mycoplasma are the smallest bacterial cells yet discovered, can survive without oxygen and are typically about 0.1 µm in diameter.

Cultures are available from the Mollicutes Culture Collection (Curators Dr. J.K. Davis and M.K. Davidson, University of Florida).
This mycoplasma species was originally isolated from a species of desert tortoise Gopherus agassizii which was named for by Louis Agassiz.

Since its discovery, it has been recovered from other species of tortoises:
 Geochelone chilensis or Chaco tortoise
 Geochelone pardalis or Leopard tortoise
 Geochelone elegans or Indian star tortoise
 Geochelone forstenii or Travancore tortoise
 Geochelone sulcate or African spurred tortoise
 Gopherus agassizii or desert  tortoise
 Gopherus polyphemus or Gopher tortoise
 Indotestudo species
 Terrapene carolina bauri or Florida box turtle
 Testudo graeca graeca or Spur-thighed tortoise
 Testudo graeca ibera or Spur-thighed tortoise 

The type strain is PS6 = ATCC 700616 = CCUG 53180 and available from the Mollicutes Culture Collection, University of Florida.

References

External links
 Type strain of Mycoplasma agassizii at BacDive -  the Bacterial Diversity Metadatabase

Bacteria described in 2001
Animal bacterial diseases
Pathogenic bacteria
agassizii